Martin Talakov (born 9 March 2003) is a Macedonian professional footballer who plays for Železiarne Podbrezová as a attacking midfielder.

Club career

FK Železiarne Podbrezová
Talakov made his professional Fortuna Liga debut for Železiarne Podbrezová against MFK Tatran Liptovský Mikuláš on 27 August 2022.

References

External links
 FK Železiarne Podbrezová official club profile 
 
 Futbalnet profile 
 

2003 births
Living people
Sportspeople from Veles, North Macedonia
Macedonian footballers
North Macedonia international footballers
North Macedonia youth international footballers
Association football midfielders
Akademija Pandev players
FK Borec players
FK Železiarne Podbrezová players
Macedonian First Football League players
Slovak Super Liga players
2. Liga (Slovakia) players
Macedonian expatriate footballers
Expatriate footballers in Slovakia
Macedonian expatriate sportspeople in Slovakia